Mamikonian is a noble family which dominated Armenian politics between the 4th and 8th century.

Mamikonian or Mamikonyan or Mamigonian may also refer to:

Mamikonian dynasty
John Mamikonean (Hovhannes Mamikonian), 7th-century author and historian
Manuel Mamikonian, 4th-century Armenian ruler, military leader, and sparapet
Mushegh I Mamikonian, 4th-century Armenian military leader and sparapet
Vardan Mamikonian (also known as Saint Vardan; 393–451), Armenian military leader, martyr and saint of the Armenian Church
Vassak Mamikonian, 4th-century Armenian military leader, sparapet for King Arsaces II (Arshak II)

Other people
Saint Shushanik (born Vardeni Mamikonian c. 440-475), early medieval Christian martyr of Armenian origin
Sophie Audouin-Mamikonian (born 1961), French-Armenian writer and author
Vardan Mamikonian (musician), French-Armenian pianist

Armenian-language surnames